Dairyu Michael Wenger is a Sōtō Zen priest and current guiding teacher of Dragons Leap Meditation Center in San Francisco.  Prior to establishing Dragons Leap in 2012, Wenger served as Dean of Buddhist Studies at the San Francisco Zen Center (SFZC) in San Francisco, California—where he has been a member since 1972. A Dharma heir of Sojun Mel Weitsman, Wenger is also a former president of the SFZC where he continues to serve on the Elders Council. He received his M.A. from The New School in New York, New York.

Bibliography

See also
Buddhism in the United States
Timeline of Zen Buddhism in the United States

Notes

References

San Francisco Zen Center
Soto Zen Buddhists
Zen Buddhist priests
American Zen Buddhists
Living people
1947 births
Religious leaders from the San Francisco Bay Area